The 2002 House elections in Oklahoma occurred on November 5, 2002 to elect the members of the State of Oklahoma's delegation to the United States House of Representatives. Oklahoma had five seats in the House, apportioned according to the 2000 United States census.

These elections were held concurrently with the United States Senate elections of 2002 (including one in Oklahoma), the United States House elections in other states, and various state and local elections.

Overview

Results

Gallery

References

2002
Oklahoma
United States House